Crassocephalum bauchiense is a species of flowering plant in the family Asteraceae. It is found in Cameroon, Equatorial Guinea, Nigeria, possibly Democratic Republic of the Congo, and possibly Uganda. Its natural habitat is moist savanna. It is threatened by habitat loss.

References

bauchiense
Flora of Cameroon
Flora of Equatorial Guinea
Flora of Nigeria
Vulnerable plants
Taxonomy articles created by Polbot